Štefan Seme (born 20 August 1947) is a Slovenian ice hockey player. He competed in the men's tournament at the 1972 Winter Olympics.

References

1947 births
Living people
Slovenian ice hockey players
Olympic ice hockey players of Yugoslavia
Ice hockey players at the 1972 Winter Olympics
Sportspeople from Ljubljana
Yugoslavia national ice hockey team coaches
Yugoslav ice hockey players
Slovenian ice hockey coaches
Yugoslav ice hockey coaches
HDD Olimpija Ljubljana players